Puu or Pu'u is a Hawaiian word for any protuberance, from a pimple to a hill, and can refer to:
Puu Kukui, mountain peak in Hawaii
Pu'u Huluhulu (Hawaii Route 200)
Pu'u 'Ō'ō (Puu Oo), volcanic cone in Hawaii
Setsuna Meioh (Sailor Pluto), Sailor Moon character
Puu (YuYu Hakusho), a major secondary character from Yu Yu Hakusho